Ray Borner OAM (born 27 May 1962) is an Australian former basketball player who competed in the National Basketball League. He was named as the NBL's Most Valuable Player for the 1985 season, becoming the first Australian born player to win the award.

College
After making his NBL debut for the Coburg Giants in 1980 at the age of 18, Borner spent the 1981–1982 off-season attending Louisiana State University where he played college basketball for the LSU Tigers.

Career
Borner played 518 NBL games over 22 seasons for four separate teams: Coburg / North Melbourne Giants, Illawarra Hawks, Geelong Supercats and Canberra Cannons. Borner won his only NBL Championship in 1989 as a member of the North Melbourne Giants who defeated the Canberra Cannons 2–0 in the best of 3 Grand Final series.

International
Borner also competed for the Boomers in four Summer Olympic Games: 1984 in Los Angeles, 1988 in Seoul, 1992 in Barcelona, and 1996 in Atlanta. He also played for the Boomers at the 1982, 1986, 1990 and 1994 FIBA World Championships

As a 6'10" (208 cm), Borner was the starting Centre during his early career with the Boomers. From around 1987 with the emergence of other players such as Mark Bradtke (208 cm), John Dorge (209 cm) and 7'2" (218 cm) Luc Longley, while still playing centre in a number of games, Borner also began playing at Power forward for the national team.

Borner was inducted into the Australian Basketball Hall of Fame in 2006 and was awarded the Order of Australia medal on Australia Day in 2009.

References

1962 births
Living people
Australian expatriate basketball people in the United States
Australian men's basketball players
1982 FIBA World Championship players
1990 FIBA World Championship players
Basketball players at the 1984 Summer Olympics
Basketball players at the 1988 Summer Olympics
Basketball players at the 1992 Summer Olympics
Basketball players at the 1996 Summer Olympics
Canberra Cannons players
Centers (basketball)
Geelong Supercats players
LSU Tigers basketball players
North Melbourne Giants players
Olympic basketball players of Australia
Illawarra Hawks players
Wollongong Hawks players
1986 FIBA World Championship players
1994 FIBA World Championship players
Sportspeople from Ballarat